The fasıl is a suite in Ottoman classical music. It is similar to the Arabic nawba and waslah.

A classical fasıl generally includes movements such as taksim, peşrev, kâr, beste, ağır semâ'î, yürük semâ'î, gazel, şarkı and saz semâ'î, played continuously without interludes and interconnected through aranağme arrangements.

A modern fasıl typically includes movements such as taksim, peşrev, şarkı (ağır aksak), yürük semâ'î, Türk aksağı, taksim, şarkı (a few with increasing tempo) and saz semâ'î.

Traditional Fasıl (both classical and modern) is a musical act distinct from the performance of "oriental" or "arabesque" pop and folk songs found at meyhanes and taverns, which have come to be sometimes referred by the same name.

See also 
Waslah
Muwashshah
Andalusi nawba
Nuubaat
Longa (Middle Eastern music)

Further reading
 
  Abstract: Project Muse

Turkish music
Turkish words and phrases
Musical forms
Suites (music)
Forms of Turkish makam music
Forms of Ottoman classical music